Climate change in Iran is leading to an increase in average annual temperatures and a decrease in annual precipitation. Iran is the largest greenhouse gas emitter not to have ratified the Paris Agreement. The country is experiencing a greater frequency of flooding and extended periods of drought due to climate change. Climate change also has implications for water scarcity, agriculture and human health in Iran.

Greenhouse gas emissions 

Iran is the largest greenhouse gas emitter not to have ratified the Paris Agreement. It is the world's sixth largest emitter, and relies heavily on its petroleum industry. From 2009 to 2019, Iran's  emissions doubled from 12 million tons to 24 million tons. Over 5 megatons of methane was emitted in 2020, which was over 7% of the world total. From 2008 to 2018, Iran's methane emissions rose from 137 million tons to 150  million tons.

Impacts 
Climate change is expected to lead to a 2.6°C increase in temperatures and 35% decrease in precipitation in Iran during the 21st century. Climate change is also expected to lead to extended periods of drought and increased frequency of flooding.

Much of Iran's territory suffers from overgrazing, desertification and deforestation. Industrial and urban wastewater runoff has contaminated rivers, coastal and underground waters. Water supplies will be affected by climate change, as well as energy, agriculture and coastal zones. Lake Urmia has shrunk in recent decades, in part due to climate change, which has contributed to water scarcity. Climate change also poses implications for health in Iran.

Mitigation and adaptation 
Other countries in the Middle East and North Africa (MENA) have begun responding to climate change in the region, but the government of Iran have not implemented mitigation policies to date. At COP26, Iranian delegate Ali Salajegheh said the country would only ratify the Paris Agreement if sanctions against Iran were lifted.

See also 

 Environmental issues in Iran
 Energy in Iran
 Water scarcity in Iran
 Climate change in the Middle East and North Africa

References

External links 

 Iran Summary at World Bank Climate Change Knowledge Portal
 Carbon Brief Profile: Iran

 
Iran
Iran